Gregory Berlanti (born May 24, 1972) is an American screenwriter, producer and director of film and television. He is known for his work on the television series Dawson's Creek, Brothers & Sisters, Everwood, Political Animals, Riverdale, Chilling Adventures of Sabrina and You, in addition to his contributions to DC Comics on film and television productions, including The CW's Arrowverse, Titans, and the Doom Patrol. In 2000, Berlanti founded the production company Berlanti Productions.

In the 2017–2018 television season, Berlanti tied Jerry Bruckheimer's 2005–2006 record in having 10 different live-action scripted television series airing on various networks and digital platforms and took sole possession of the record, with 14 airing in the 2018–19 television season, having signed the most expensive producer deal at that time (June 2018) with Warner Bros. In the 2019–20 television season, with one cancellation and two new series, Berlanti increased the record to 18. Berlanti also directed the 2018 film Love, Simon, a gay romantic comedy-drama which grossed $66million worldwide.

Berlanti was named on Times list of the 100 most influential people in the world in 2020.

Career
In 1998, at the age of 26, Berlanti landed his first writing job on The WB's Dawson's Creek, where he quickly rose through the producing ranks from staff writer to executive producer. When creator and then-showrunner Kevin Williamson decided to step away from the show, 28-year-old Berlanti was promoted to showrunner.

Berlanti has spoken in many interviews about the importance of introducing a gay character into a primetime television show and featuring the first same-sex kiss between two men on U.S. network television on Dawson's Creek. Speaking with The Hollywood Reporter, he stated, “In the beginning, there was resistance. When we did the Jack kiss on Dawson's Creek, everyone was tentative. But I took over the show and that was an important thing to me. If we were going to bring the character out, it seemed silly to me that he couldn't kiss.” When asked what he would have done if the network had said no to the kiss, Berlanti added, “I was prepared to quit. I really was.”

Berlanti subsequently created two drama series for Warner Brothers: Everwood and Jack & Bobby. He and his business partner Mickey Liddell struck a deal with Warner Bros. in March 2003 via Berlanti/Liddell Productions. By the age of 32, he had also already directed his first feature film,  The Broken Hearts Club: A Romantic Comedy, which starred Timothy Olyphant, Zach Braff, Justin Theroux, and Dean Cain. After three years at Warner Bros., he moved to Touchstone Television in 2006 and set up Berlanti Television as his new production company.

In 2006, Berlanti produced and wrote Brothers & Sisters for ABC, which aired for five seasons and featured the first same-sex legal marriage on network television. He replaced Marti Noxon, who departed the show because of creative differences.

In 2007, Berlanti executive-produced Dirty Sexy Money for ABC, which aired for two seasons and featured the first recurring transgender character on primetime television.

In 2008, Berlanti created and produced the ABC legal drama Eli Stone and, in 2012, the USA miniseries Political Animals. At ABC, he produced and worked alongside Jon Harmon Feldman, former Dirty Sexy Money showrunner, to create No Ordinary Family. In 2011, he shifted from ABC Studios back to its original home at Warner Bros. Television. For NBC, he produced The Mysteries of Laura, an American adaptation of the Spanish television series, which premiered on September 17, 2014, and Blindspot, which premiered on September 21, 2015.

Berlanti directed the 2010 film Life as We Know It, starring Katherine Heigl and Josh Duhamel. He produced the film Pan for Warner Bros. under his Berlanti Productions banner; the film was released October 9, 2015.

In January 2016, The CW ordered  the Berlanti-produced television pilot Riverdale, based on the characters from Archie Comics. The pilot was picked up to series in May 2016. Riverdale premiered on January 26, 2017, and was renewed for a second season on March 7, 2017. In September 2017, it was reported that a live-action television series based on the comic book Chilling Adventures of Sabrina was in development for The CW by Warner Bros. Television and Berlanti Productions. In December 2017, the project had moved to Netflix, and the first season of Chilling Adventures of Sabrina was released on October 26, 2018. On December 18, 2018, Netflix renewed the series for a second season.

In February 2015, it was announced that Berlanti and Sera Gamble would develop a series for Showtime based on Caroline Kepnes's thriller novel You. Two years later, it was announced that the series was purchased by Lifetime and put on fast-track development. You premiered on September 9, 2018. On July 26, 2018, ahead of the series premiere, Lifetime announced that the series had been renewed for a second season. On December 3, 2018, it was confirmed that Lifetime had passed on the series and that Netflix picked up the series ahead of the release of the second season. The second season was released on December 26, 2019. On January 14, 2020, Netflix renewed You for a third season, which was released on October 15, 2021. In October 2021, ahead of the third season premiere, the series was renewed for a fourth season.

More recently, his Berlanti/Schechter Films company had a first-look deal with Netflix.

DC Comics

Film
Berlanti co-wrote and co-produced the DC Comics film Green Lantern, starring Ryan Reynolds as the titular character. As the film was neither critically nor financially successful, further planned releases were cancelled.

In May 2016, Berlanti discussed his involvement, as producer and possibly as director, in a Booster Gold feature film that was in development. Zack Stentz was signed to the project as screenwriter. It is still in movie limbo.

Arrowverse
In January 2012, it was announced that, along with Andrew Kreisberg and Marc Guggenheim, Berlanti would create, write, and produce a series called Arrow, based on Green Arrow, for The CW. The series premiered on October 10, 2012, and was picked up to full series in the same month. On July 30, 2013, it was announced at the summer TCA tour that Berlanti, Kreisberg, and DC Comics CCO Geoff Johns would be introducing Barry Allen in the second season of Arrow, with the possibility of the character being spun off to his own series. Actor Grant Gustin was cast and made his debut in episode 8, "The Scientist." In November 2013, The CW officially ordered a pilot for The Flash, and in May 2014, the network picked the project up to series, with a premiere scheduled for autumn of that year.

On February 26, 2015, it was announced that Berlanti, along with Guggenheim and Kreisberg, would write and executive produce a spin-off series featuring The Atom (Brandon Routh), Captain Cold (Wentworth Miller), Martin Stein (Victor Garber), and The White Canary (Caity Lotz), for a potential 2016 premiere. The series was ultimately titled Legends of Tomorrow, and it followed a ragtag team of heroes and villains as they traveled through time and space on a mission to stop the devious immortal Vandal Savage. The series premiered on January 21, 2016, and was renewed for a second season on March 11, 2016.

Supergirl
On September 4, 2014, it was reported that Berlanti would executive-produce a re-imagining of the origin of Supergirl, to be written by The New Normal and Chuck alum Ali Adler. The Flash co-creator Johns was also involved with development. On September 19, 2014, it was reported that CBS had made a series commitment to Supergirl. It was also announced that Berlanti would co-write the first episode.

After its first season, the show moved from CBS to The CW, bringing all live-action Arrowverse shows together on one network. The show made history in 2018 for featuring the first live-action transgender superhero when Nicole Maines was cast in a main role.

Other DC shows
Berlanti worked with Mara Brock Akil and her husband Salim Akil to develop Black Lightning which also aired on The CW.

Berlanti also produced Titans, starring Brenton Thwaites, with Akiva Goldsman, Geoff Johns, and Sarah Schechter; Doom Patrol, starring Matt Bomer and Brendan Fraser, with Jeremy Carver, Geoff Johns, and Sarah Schechter; and Stargirl starring Brec Bassinger, with Greg Beeman, Melissa Carter, Geoff Johns, Sarah Schechter, and Glen Winter.

In 2017, Berlanti wrote and executive-produced Freedom Fighters: The Ray for The CW's streaming platform. The show was praised for its depiction of the first openly gay superhero to headline a series.

In 2019, it was announced that Berlanti would be producing shows based on Green Lantern and Strange Adventures for HBO Max. It was also revealed that Berlanti would also serve as a writer on the Green Lantern series. Both shows were scrapped in 2023.

Personal life
He was born in Suffern, New York. His parents are Barbara Moller Berlanti and Eugene Berlanti. He attended Rye High School in Rye, NY graduating with the class of 1989. Greg has one sister, Dina and two nieces. He has Italian and Irish ancestry. He described his early life in an August 2004 interview with Entertainment Weekly: "We were Italians in a town of WASPs" and his family was not "doing as well as 90% of the community." The Berlanti Productions production logo, which follows each episode of shows he produces, features a family with their backs to the audience and the spoken quote, "Greg, move your head!" This is an homage to Berlanti's father, Gene, who would yell at Greg when he was blocking the television screen. Berlanti, a Delta Tau Delta alumnus graduated from Northwestern University in 1994.

Berlanti has been in a relationship with ex-LA Galaxy soccer player Robbie Rogers since mid-2013. On December 31, 2016, Rogers and Berlanti announced they had become engaged. Their wedding occurred on December 2, 2017. They have two children born via surrogacy, a son in 2016 and a daughter in 2019.

Awards and honors
In 2022, Berlanti received the high honor of the Norman Lear Achievement Award at the 33rd annual PGA Awards for his remarkable impact on the art and craft of television.

In 2019, Berlanti received the Television Showman of the Year Award  at the 56th Annual ICG Publicists Awards, the Patron of the Artists Award  at the SAG-AFTRA Foundation 45th Annual Patron of the Artists Awards, the Kieser Award  at the 45th Annual Humanitas Prize Awards and the Outstanding Film – Wide Release Award  for "Love, Simon" at the 30th Annual GLAAD Media Awards.

Additional honors include: Los Angeles LGBT Center's 49th Anniversary Gala Vanguard Awards Honoree; Friends of the Saban Community Clinic's 43rd Annual Gala Honoree; Variety Hall of Fame Inductee; Northwestern University School of Communication Graduation Convocation Address.

In 2018, Berlanti was selected for the Vanguard Award  by the Los Angeles LGBT Center, The Founders Award  by the International Emmy Awards, The Hero Award  by the Trevor Project, 500 Most Powerful People Working in the Global Media Business Today by Variety, in addition to winning a Teen Choice Award for The Flash, Riverdale and Love, Simon.

Additional wins include; 2017 for Teen Choice Award for Choice Drama TV Show for Riverdale  and 2016 People's Choice Award wins for Supergirl and The Flash.

In 2021, The Flight Attendant earned nine Emmy Awards nominations, including "Outstanding Comedy Series." The show also earned two Golden Globe Awards nominations, including "Best Television Series, Musical or Comedy."

Past honors include; a 2012 Directors Guild of America nomination for Outstanding Directorial Achievement in Movies for Television and Miniseries in recognition for Direction of Political Animals Pilot, a 2013 Emmy Award nomination for Outstanding Miniseries or Movie for Political Animals, a 2014 Saturn Award for Best Superhero Adaptation Television Series for The Flash as well as The Christopher Award for The Flash, a Leo Award Best Dramatic Series nomination for Arrow in 2013 as well as a Fan Favorite Awards and Fan Favorite New Show by TV Guide for Arrow, the Honors Writer Award by The Caucus in 2010, the Alumni Merit Award by the Northwestern Alumni Association in 2006, a 2005 a Gracie Award Presented by the Foundation of American Women in Radio and Television, the Religion Communicators Council Wilbur Award for the “A Man of Faith” episode of Jack & Bobby in 2005, the Turner Prize at the Environmental Media Awards in 2003 for Everwood, a GLAAD Media Award in 2001 for The Broken Hearts Club and a 2000 SHINE Award for his writing work on Dawson's Creek. Berlanti was also recognized by Variety in 2000 for their Watchable Helmers issue, as well as their 2018 Inclusion Impact Report and by The Hollywood Reporter in their 'Power 100 List'  and 'Power Showrunners List' in 2018. In 2017, Berlanti was selected for the Brandon Tartikoff Legacy Award.  In 2021, Berlanti was awarded The Actors Fund Encore Award for his support of entertainment industry professionals throughout the pandemic.

Philanthropy

Northwestern Endowment 
In 2020, Berlanti gifted $2 million  through his organization, the Berlanti Family Foundation, to his alma mater, the Northwestern University School of Communication, to establish a new dramatic writing professorship. The new professorship was named the Barbara Berlanti Professorship in Writing for the Screen and Stage after Berlanti's late mother, who he described as a “lifelong champion of the arts.”

The professorship helped to increase the teaching capacity and number of courses offered in the school's Department of Radio/Television/Film (RTVF). Berlanti also previously gave an endowment to Northwestern's playwriting program.

Berlanti's latest endowment to Northwestern marks the Berlanti Family Foundation's largest charitable contribution for a single organization to date. Berlanti said he “aims to help Northwestern continue its great legacy of fostering the next generation of humane, diverse, courageous and bold storytellers.”

Fuck Cancer 
Berlanti is a board member of Fuck Cancer, a health organization working for early detection and prevention of cancer. Launched in 2009, Fuck Cancer aims to engage millennials through social media to have a conversation about early detection and acute awareness of cancer.

Annual Barbara Berlanti Gala 
In 2018, Berlanti and husband Robbie Rogers chaired Fuck Cancer's inaugural Barbara Berlanti Heroes Gala, named in honor of his late mother. Berlanti Productions was also a sponsor of the event.

Kristin Chenoweth headlined the event, while co-founder Yael Cohen Braun and board member Stephen Amell were the headline honorees at the event.

Berlanti said that his mother Barbara was the most charitable person he ever knew and that there was no better way to honor her than a night of fun and giving back to this incredible organization.

Filmography

Film

Producer
 Green Lantern: Emerald Knights (2011)
 Green Lantern (2011)
 Haunted (2013)
 Pan (2015)
 Deathstroke: Knights & Dragons: The Movie (2020) (Executive producer)
 Unpregnant (2020)
 Free Guy (2021)
 Moonshot (2022)
 My Policeman (2022)
 Altas (TBA)
 Red White & Royal Blue (TBA)
 Rock Hudson: All That Heaven Allowed (TBA)

Television

Executive producer only

References

External links

 
 

1972 births
Living people
American television writers
American male television writers
American gay writers
American writers of Italian descent
American LGBT screenwriters
People from Rye, New York
Northwestern University alumni
American people of Irish descent
LGBT people from New York (state)
LGBT television producers
Television producers from New York (state)
Showrunners
International Emmy Founders Award winners
Screenwriters from New York (state)